Rachel DeLoache Williams (born January 29, 1988) is an American writer, photographer, and editor. She worked as a photo editor and producer for Vanity Fair until 2019. Williams is known for being the former friend of Anna Sorokin, who pretended to be a German heiress and was accused of conning Williams out of $62,000, which was only paid back partially by Sorokin but forgiven by her credit card company.

Williams later reported Sorokin to the New York City Police Department and the New York County District Attorney, helping the police locate and arrest Sorokin in Los Angeles and testified against her in court. She wrote an article about her experiences with Sorokin for Vanity Fair in 2018. Since then, she has written for Time and Air Mail and wrote the book My Friend Anna: the True Story of the Fake Heiress of New York City.

Biography 
Williams is originally from Knoxville, Tennessee, the daughter of two clinical psychologists. She graduated from Kenyon College in 2010 with degrees in English and studio art. While a student, she interned in New York City for Art + Commerce, Harper's Bazaar, and Mercedes-Benz Fashion Week. Williams worked as a photo editor and producer at Vanity Fair, assisting in and producing photoshoots. She worked on shoots for Caitlyn Jenner, Rihanna, and Patti Smith. Williams was laid off in 2019.

She met Anna Sorokin through friends in February 2015. Sorokin, who had created the identity of a German heiress named Anna Delvey, and Williams became friends and attended dinners and events in New York City together. While on a vacation with Sorokin and Kacy Duke at La Mamounia in Marrakesh in May 2017, Sorokin's credit card stopped working and Williams offered to pay the $62,000 for the trip on both her personal and business credit cards with the promise that Sorokin would wire her the money when her bank would allow her.  Sorokin paid back $5,000, but not the remaining difference of $57,000, and Williams reported the incident to the New York City Police Department and the New York County District Attorney. Williams helped the police track down and arrest Sorokin in Los Angeles, and testified against her in court. While Sorokin was found guilty on four counts of theft of services, one count of attempted grand larceny, and three counts of grand larceny, she was not found guilty for stealing from Williams, and even though she was found not guilty,  Williams' credit card company did forgive the majority of her debt.

Since leaving Vanity Fair, Williams works as a writer and photographer. In 2018 she published an article for Vanity Fair about her experience with Sorokin, titled As An Added Bonus, She Paid For Everything: My Bright-Lights Misadventure With A Magician of Manhattan, and in 2019 published the book My Friend Anna: The True Story of a Fake Heiress. She also made deals for projects with HBO and Simon & Schuster about Sorokin. Williams was paid $35,000 for her HBO deal, $300,000 for her book deal, and $1,300 for her magazine article.

Williams was interviewed on The Sinfluencer of Soho, an episode of the ABC network news program, 20/20, which aired on October 1, 2021.

She is portrayed by Katie Lowes in the Netflix drama series Inventing Anna. In February 2022, Williams wrote an essay for Air Mail criticizing the Netflix series for putting out a "fictional story" and "putting money in her [Sorokin’s] pocket."

On May 11, 2022, Williams was interviewed about her experience with Sorokin on Red Table Talk'''s episode Tinder Swindler and Anna Delvey Victims: What You Haven’t Heard''.

References 

Living people
1988 births
American magazine writers
American non-fiction crime writers
American women photographers
Kenyon College alumni
Photographers from Tennessee
People from Knoxville, Tennessee
Women magazine editors
Writers from Tennessee